This is a list of the 72 Members of Parliament (MPs) elected to the House of Commons of the United Kingdom by Scottish constituencies for the Fifty-First Parliament of the United Kingdom (1992 to 1997) at the 1992 United Kingdom general election.

Composition at election

Composition at dissolution

List

By-elections 

 1994 Monklands East by-election, Helen Liddell, Labour
 1995 Perth and Kinross by-election, Roseanna Cunningham, SNP

See also 

 Lists of MPs for constituencies in Scotland

Lists of UK MPs 1992–1997
Lists of MPs for constituencies in Scotland
1992 United Kingdom general election